Sodium coceth sulfate is a semisynthetic detergent-like compound derived from fatty acids obtained from coconut oil, modified using ethylene oxide (oxirane). It is a milder foaming agent found in baby cleansers, gels, and cleaners.

References 
 Cleaning product components
 Sulfate esters